Howard Wilson Baker, Jr (April 5, 1905 – July 25, 1990) was an American poet, dramatist, and literary critic.

Background

Baker was born in Philadelphia. While pursuing graduate studies in English at Stanford University, he befriended Yvor Winters, and was co-editor of the literary magazine Gyroscope. After earning his master's degree, he moved to Paris to study at the Sorbonne. While there, he married the novelist Dorothy Baker, and met and was influenced by Ernest Hemingway and Ford Madox Ford, who helped him to publish his first work, the autobiographical novel Orange Valley (1931).

After returning to the United States in 1931, he took a position teaching English at Berkeley. From 1937 to 1943, he then taught English at Harvard.

In addition to collaborating with his wife, Baker produced poetry collections of his own, including Letter from the Country (1941) and Ode to the Sea (1954), as well as a collection of essays on ancient Greek culture, Persephone's Cave: Cultural Accumulations of the Early Greeks (1979).

Baker died from cancer in Porterville, California on Wednesday, July 25, 1990.

References

Research resources
 The papers of Dorothy and Howard Baker, 1926-1990 (33 linear ft.) are housed in the Department of Special Collections and University Archives at Stanford University Libraries

External links
 Dorothy and Howard Baker bios from Stanford

1905 births
1990 deaths
Poets from Pennsylvania
Stanford University School of Humanities and Sciences alumni
University of Paris alumni
University of California, Berkeley College of Letters and Science faculty
Harvard University faculty
Writers from Philadelphia
20th-century American poets
20th-century American dramatists and playwrights
American male dramatists and playwrights
American male poets
American expatriates in France
20th-century American male writers